Louis-Marie Quicherat (13 October 1799 – 17 November 1884) was a French Latinist best known for his Latin Dictionary. He is referenced in the short story "Funes the Memorious" by Jorge Luis Borges.

1799 births
1884 deaths
French Latinists